Autocross (also called "Solo", "Auto-x" or "Autoslalom") is a timed competition in which drivers navigate one at a time through a defined course on either a sealed or an unsealed surface. It is a form of motorsports that emphasizes safe competition and active participation. Autocross differs from road racing and oval racing in that generally there is only one car on the track, driving against the clock rather than other cars. As an entry-level motorsport it provides a stepping stone for drivers looking to move into other more competitive and possibly expensive forms of racing (such as rallying, rallycross and circuit racing).

Autocross courses are typically one to two kilometres long and tend to place demands on car handling and driver skill rather than on engine power and outright speed. Courses may be temporary and marked by traffic cones or be permanent tracks with approval by a motorsport body.

Events typically have many classes that allow almost any vehicle, from economy sedans to purpose-built racing cars, to compete. Due to the nature of a typical track, speeds can be slower when compared to other forms of motorsports, usually not exceeding highway speeds, but the activity level (measured in discrete turns per minute) can be higher than even Formula One due to the large number of elements packed into each course.

Australian autocross

Australian autocross is type of motorsport sanctioned by the Confederation of Australian Motor Sport, which defines it as a speed event held on a dirt course less than two kilometres long. Eligible vehicles range from standard road-going cars through purpose-built buggies to full race- and rally-prepared machines. Drivers may begin competing at the age of 14 and must hold a recognised racing licence, which is usually obtainable on the day through the hosting club.

American autocross

American autocross is a form of autocross practiced in the United States of America. Events are typically held on flat, paved surfaces such as parking lots or airport tarmacs, and usually have a new course for each event, marked by traffic cones.

Autocross is one of the most accessible and affordable forms of motorsport, and autocross events are open to novices. Because autocross events use rubber traffic cones to define the course, and are typically run on paved surfaces with few obstructions, the hazards and barriers to entry are low. While speeds are generally no greater than those encountered in legal highway driving, the combination of concentration and precision maneuvering gives drivers an experience similar to that of a full road course race. 

Competitors range from casual participants driving their commuter vehicles, to dedicated competitors driving purpose-built cars with special tires. There are classes accommodating varying degrees of car modification, as well as classes specifically for women and children.

Many events are open to spectators. Many local car clubs offer autocross novice driving schools to help drivers feel comfortable before a regular event.

The SCCA National Championship is held in  September in the midwest.  Currently (2019 and prior) held in Lincoln, Nebraska. Entries are in the range of 1200 drivers.  The event takes place over 4 days with half the drivers competing  on the first two days and half the last two days.  Two different courses are driven with winners determined by combining best times from both courses. It is considered the largest amateur motorsport racing event in the world.

British autocross
In the United Kingdom, autocrosses are typically held on a grass or stubble surface, an added attraction being the challenge of driving quickly on difficult surfaces. Cars compete individually against the clock, although more than one car may start at the same time if the circuit is long enough and wide enough. Because the course is usually bumpy and there is a risk of contact with other cars, most competitors use specially prepared cars (which vary from very inexpensive to specially engineered racers) brought on trailers. Events are usually held on a region-wide basis, with MotorsportUK, overseeing rules and regulations.

Some people choose to start singularly, particularly if they compete in a rally car. The sport is relatively low risk as there is or should be nothing to hit. However, if you wish, you may do double car starts. Most people opt for this, although some competitors choose to do 3 and 4 car starts whilst still competing against the clock.

History 
The British autocross began in the early 1950s when clubs organized timed runs around courses set on farmers' fields. By 1954, Taunton MC organized the first ever autocross series in the United Kingdom. This, however, was only repeated in 1959 when the club was awarded the permit to hold the British National Autocross event. Shortly, thereafter, the sporting event caught on and, by 1963, the ASWMC Autocross Championship was finally launched.

Presently, there are many local clubs which host across the UK, although the main regions hosting Autocross events are: AEMC for East Anglia, ANECCC - North East, and, the ASWMC for the South-West region. The ASWMC, for its part, now has 13 different Championships, which attract around 250 contenders each year. The regional autocross events also have different formats. For instance, the South West follows the traditional two-car start, except for the 4 abreast Sandocross that used to run at Weston-Super-Mare, while the North East region involves 4-car autocross.

European autocross

European autocross is significantly different from most other types in that cars compete at once, wheel to wheel, and so is similar to Folkrace.

See also
Gymkhana (motorsport)
Hungarian Autókrossz

References

Auto racing by type